The North American B-25 Mitchell is an American medium bomber that was introduced in 1941 and named in honor of Major General William "Billy" Mitchell, a pioneer of U.S. military aviation. Used by many Allied air forces, the B-25 served in every theater of World War II, and after the war ended, many remained in service, operating across four decades. Produced in numerous variants, nearly 10,000 B-25s were built. These included several limited models such as the F-10 reconnaissance aircraft, the AT-24 crew trainers, and the United States Marine Corps' PBJ-1 patrol bomber.

Design and development

No YB-25 was available for prototype service tests. In September 1939, the Air Corps ordered the NA-62 into production as the B-25, along with the other new Air Corps medium bomber, the Martin B-26 Marauder "off the drawing board".

Early into B-25 production, NAA incorporated a significant redesign to the wing dihedral. The first nine aircraft had a constant-dihedral, meaning the wing had a consistent, upward angle from the fuselage to the wingtip. This design caused stability problems. "Flattening" the outer wing panels by giving them a slight anhedral angle just outboard of the engine nacelles nullified the problem and gave the B-25 its gull wing configuration. Less noticeable changes during this period included an increase in the size of the tail fins and a decrease in their inward tilt at their tops.

NAA continued design and development in 1940 and 1941. Both the B-25A and B-25B series entered USAAF service. The B-25B was operational in 1942. Combat requirements led to further developments. Before the year was over, NAA was producing the B-25C and B-25D series at different plants. Also in 1942, the manufacturer began design work on the cannon-armed B-25G series. The NA-100 of 1943 and 1944 was an interim armament development at the Kansas City complex known as the B-25D2. Similar armament upgrades by U.S-based commercial modification centers involved about half of the B-25G series. Further development led to the B-25H, B-25J, and B-25J2. The gunship design concept dates to late 1942 and NAA sent a field technical representative to the SWPA. The factory-produced B-25G entered production during the NA-96 order followed by the redesigned B-25H gunship. The B-25J reverted to the bomber role, but it, too, could be outfitted as a strafer.

NAA manufactured the greatest number of aircraft in World War II, the first time a company had produced trainers, bombers, and fighters simultaneously (the AT-6/SNJ Texan/Harvard, B-25 Mitchell, and the P-51 Mustang). It produced B-25s at both its Inglewood main plant and an additional 6,608 aircraft at its Kansas City, Kansas, plant at Fairfax Airport.

After the war, the USAF placed a contract for the TB-25L trainer in 1952. This was a modification program by Hayes of Birmingham, Alabama. Its primary role was reciprocating engine pilot training.

A development of the B-25 was the North American XB-28 Dragon, designed as a high-altitude bomber. Two prototypes were built with the second prototype, the XB-28A, evaluated as a photo-reconnaissance platform, but the aircraft did not enter production.

Operational history

Asia-Pacific 
Most B-25s in American service were used in the war against Japan in Asia and the Pacific. The Mitchell fought from the Northern Pacific to the South Pacific and the Far East. These areas included the campaigns in the Aleutian Islands, Papua New Guinea, the Solomon Islands, New Britain, China, Burma and the island hopping campaign in the Central Pacific. The aircraft's potential as a ground-attack aircraft emerged during the Pacific war. The jungle environment reduced the usefulness of medium-level bombing, and made low-level attack the best tactic. Using similar mast height level tactics and skip bombing, the B-25 proved itself to be a capable anti-shipping weapon and sank many enemy sea vessels. An ever-increasing number of forward firing guns made the B-25 a formidable strafing aircraft for island warfare. The strafer models were the B-25C1/D1, the B-25J1 and with the NAA strafer nose, the J2 subseries.

In Burma, the B-25 was used to attack Japanese communication links, especially bridges in central Burma. It also helped supply the besieged troops at Imphal in 1944. The China Air Task Force, the Chinese American Composite Wing, the First Air Commando Group, the 341st Bomb Group, and eventually, the relocated 12th Bomb Group, all operated the B-25 in the China Burma India Theater. Many of these missions involved battle-field isolation, interdiction, and close air support.

Later in the war, as the USAAF acquired bases in other parts of the Pacific, the Mitchell could strike targets in Indochina, Formosa, and Kyushu, increasing the usefulness of the B-25. It was also used in some of the shortest raids of the Pacific War, striking from Saipan against Guam and Tinian. The 41st Bomb Group used it against Japanese-occupied islands that had been bypassed by the main campaign, such as the Marshall Islands.

Middle East and Italy 
The first B-25s arrived in Egypt and were carrying out independent operations by October 1942. Operations there against Axis airfields and motorized vehicle columns supported the ground actions of the Second Battle of El Alamein. Thereafter, the aircraft took part in the rest of the campaign in North Africa, the invasion of Sicily, and the advance up Italy. In the Strait of Messina to the Aegean Sea, the B-25 conducted sea sweeps as part of the coastal air forces. In Italy, the B-25 was used in the ground attack role, concentrating on attacks against road and rail links in Italy, Austria, and the Balkans. The B-25 had a longer range than the Douglas A-20 Havoc and Douglas A-26 Invader, allowing it to reach further into occupied Europe. The five bombardment groups – 20 squadrons – of the Ninth and Twelfth Air Forces that used the B-25 in the Mediterranean Theater of Operations were the only U.S. units to employ the B-25 in Europe.

Europe 
The RAF received nearly 900 Mitchells, using them to replace Douglas Bostons, Lockheed Venturas, and Vickers Wellington bombers. The Mitchell entered active RAF service on 22 January 1943. At first, it was used to bomb targets in occupied Europe. After the Normandy invasion, the RAF and France used Mitchells in support of the Allies in Europe. Several squadrons moved to forward airbases on the continent. The USAAF used the B-25 in combat in the European theater of operations.

USAAF 

The B-25B found fame as the bomber used in the 18 April 1942 Doolittle Raid, in which 16 B-25Bs led by Lieutenant Colonel Jimmy Doolittle attacked mainland Japan, four months after the bombing of Pearl Harbor. The mission gave a much-needed lift in morale to the Americans and alarmed the Japanese, who had believed their home islands to be inviolable by enemy forces. Although the amount of actual damage done was relatively minor, it forced the Japanese to divert troops for home defense for the remainder of the war.

The raiders took off from the carrier  and successfully bombed Tokyo and four other Japanese cities. Fifteen of the bombers subsequently crash-landed en route to recovery fields in eastern China. The losses resulted from the task force being spotted by a Japanese vessel, which forced the bombers to take off  early, fuel exhaustion, stormy nighttime conditions with zero visibility, and unactivated electronic homing aids at the recovery bases. Only one B-25 bomber landed intact, in Siberia, where its five-man crew was interned and the aircraft confiscated. Of the 80 aircrew members, 69 survived their historic mission and eventually made it back to American lines.

Following additional modifications, including the addition of a Plexiglas dome for navigational sightings to replace the overhead window for the navigator, and heavier nose armament, de-icing and anti-icing equipment, the B-25C entered USAAF operations. Through block 20, the B-25C and B-25D differed only in the location of manufacture: C series at Inglewood, California, and D series at Kansas City, Kansas. After block 20, some NA-96s began the transition to the G series, while some NA-87s acquired interim modifications eventually produced as the B-25D2 and ordered as the NA-100. NAA built a total of 3,915 B-25Cs and Ds during World War II.

Although the B-25 was designed to bomb from medium altitudes in level flight, it was frequently used in the Southwest Pacific theatre in treetop-level strafing and missions with parachute-retarded fragmentation bombs against Japanese airfields in New Guinea and the Philippines. These heavily armed Mitchells were field-modified at Townsville, Australia, under the direction of Major Paul I. "Pappy" Gunn and North American technical representative Jack Fox. These "commerce destroyers" were also used on strafing and skip bombing missions against Japanese shipping trying to resupply their armies.

Under the leadership of Lieutenant General George C. Kenney, Mitchells of the Far East Air Forces and its existing components, the Fifth and Thirteenth Air Forces, devastated Japanese targets in the Southwest Pacific Theater during 1944 to 1945. The USAAF played a significant role in pushing the Japanese back to their home islands. The type operated with great effect in the Central Pacific, Alaska, North Africa, Mediterranean, and China-Burma-India theaters.

The USAAF Antisubmarine Command made great use of the B-25 in 1942 and 1943. Some of the earliest B-25 bomb groups also flew the Mitchell on coastal patrols after the Pearl Harbor attack, prior to the AAFAC organization. Many of the two dozen or so antisubmarine squadrons flew the B-25C, D, and G series in the American Theater antisubmarine campaign, often in the distinctive, white sea-search camouflage.

Combat developments

Use as a gunship 

In anti-shipping operations, the USAAF had an urgent need for hard-hitting aircraft, and North American responded with the B-25G. In this series, the transparent nose and bombardier/navigator position was changed for a shorter, hatched nose with two fixed .50 in (12.7 mm) machine guns and a manually loaded 75 mm (2.95 in) M4 cannon, one of the largest weapons fitted to an aircraft, similar to the British 57 mm gun-armed Mosquito Mk. XVIII and the autoloading German 75 mm long-barrel Bordkanone BK 7,5 heavy-calibre ordnance fitted to both the Henschel Hs 129B-3 and Junkers Ju 88P-1. The B-25G's shorter nose placed the cannon breech behind the pilot, where it could be manually loaded and serviced by the navigator; his crew station was moved to a position just behind the pilot. The navigator signaled the pilot when the gun was ready and the pilot fired the weapon using a button on his control wheel.

The Royal Air Force, U.S. Navy, and Soviet VVS each conducted trials with this series, but none adopted it. The G series comprised one prototype, five preproduction C conversions, 58 C series modifications, and 400 production aircraft for a total of 464 B-25Gs. In its final version, the G-12, an interim armament modification, eliminated the lower Bendix turret and added a starboard dual gun pack, waist guns, and a canopy for the tail gunner to improve the view when firing the single tail gun. In April 1945, the air depots in Hawaii refurbished about two dozen of these and included the eight-gun nose and rocket launchers in the upgrade.

The B-25H series continued the development of the gunship version. NAA Inglewood produced 1000. The H had even more firepower. Most replaced the M4 gun with the lighter T13E1, designed specifically for the aircraft, but 20-odd H-1 block aircraft completed by the Republic Aviation modification center at Evansville had the M4 and two-machine-gun nose armament. Due to its slow rate of fire (about four rounds could be fired in a single strafing run), relative ineffectiveness against ground targets, and the substantial recoil, the 75 mm gun was sometimes removed from both G and H models and replaced with two additional .50 in (12.7 mm) machine guns as a field modification. In the new FEAF, these were redesignated the G1 and H1 series, respectively.

The H series normally came from the factory mounting four fixed, forward-firing .50 in (12.7 mm) machine guns in the nose; four in a pair of under-cockpit conformal flank-mount gun pod packages (two guns per side); two more in the manned dorsal turret, relocated forward to a position just behind the cockpit (which became standard for the J-model); one each in a pair of new waist positions, introduced simultaneously with the forward-relocated dorsal turret; and lastly, a pair of guns in a new tail-gunner's position. Company promotional material bragged that the B-25H could "bring to bear 10 machine guns coming and four going, in addition to the 75 mm cannon, eight rockets, and 3,000 lb (1,360 kg) of bombs."

The H had a modified cockpit with single flight controls operated by the pilot. The co-pilot's station and controls were removed and replaced by a smaller seat used by the navigator/cannoneer, The radio operator crew position was aft of the bomb bay with access to the waist guns. Factory production totals were 405 B-25Gs and 1,000 B-25Hs, with 248 of the latter being used by the Navy as PBJ-1Hs. Elimination of the co-pilot saved weight, and moving the dorsal turret forward partially counterbalanced the waist guns and the manned rear turret.

Return to medium bomber 
Following the two gunship series, NAA again produced the medium bomber configuration with the B-25J series. It optimized the mix of the interim NA-100 and the H series, having both the bombardier's station and fixed guns of the D and the forward turret and refined armament of the H series. NAA also produced a strafer nose-first shipped to air depots as kits, then introduced on the production line in alternating blocks with the bombardier nose. The solid-metal "strafer" nose housed eight centerline Browning M2 .50 caliber machine guns. The remainder of the armament was as in the H-5. NAA also supplied kits to mount eight underwing 5 inches "high velocity airborne rockets" (HVAR) just outside the propeller arcs. These were mounted on zero-length launch rails, four to a wing.

The final, and most numerous, series of the Mitchell, the B-25J, looked less like earlier series apart from the well-glazed bombardier's nose of nearly identical appearance to the earliest B-25 subtypes. Instead, the J followed the overall configuration of the H series from the cockpit aft. It had the forward dorsal turret and other armament and airframe advancements. All J models included four .50 in (12.7 mm) light-barrel Browning AN/M2 guns in a pair of "fuselage packages", conformal gun pods each flanking the lower cockpit, each pod containing two Browning M2s. By 1945, however, combat squadrons removed these. The J series restored the co-pilot's seat and dual flight controls. The factory made kits available to the Air Depot system to create the strafer-nose B-25J-2. This configuration carried a total of 18 .50 in (12.7 mm) light-barrel AN/M2 Browning M2 machine guns: eight in the nose, four in the flank-mount conformal gun pod packages, two in the dorsal turret, one each in the pair of waist positions, and a pair in the tail – with 14 of the guns either aimed directly forward or aimed to fire directly forward for strafing missions. Some aircraft had eight 5-inch (130 mm) high-velocity aircraft rockets. NAA introduced the J-2 into production in alternating blocks at the J-22. Total J series production was 4,318.

Flight characteristics 
The B-25 was a safe and forgiving aircraft to fly. With one engine out, 60° banking turns into the dead engine were possible, and control could be easily maintained down to 145 mph (230 km/h). The pilot had to remember to maintain engine-out directional control at low speeds after takeoff with rudder; if this maneuver were attempted with ailerons, the aircraft could snap out of control. The tricycle landing gear made for excellent visibility while taxiing. The only significant complaint about the B-25 was its extremely noisy engines; as a result, many pilots eventually suffered from some degree of hearing loss.

The high noise level was due to design and space restrictions in the engine cowlings, which resulted in the exhaust "stacks" protruding directly from the cowling ring and partly covered by a small triangular fairing. This arrangement directed exhaust and noise directly at the pilot and crew compartments.

Durability 

The Mitchell was exceptionally sturdy and could withstand tremendous punishment. One B-25C of the 321st Bomb Group was nicknamed "Patches" because its crew chief painted all the aircraft's flak hole patches with bright yellow zinc chromate primer. By the end of the war, this aircraft had completed over 300 missions, had been belly-landed six times, and had over 400 patched holes. The airframe of "Patches" was so distorted from battle damage that straight-and-level flight required 8° of left aileron trim and 6° of right rudder, causing the aircraft to "crab" sideways across the sky.

Postwar (USAF) use 
In 1947, legislation created an independent United States Air Force and by that time, the B-25 inventory numbered only a few hundred. Some B-25s continued in service into the 1950s in training, reconnaissance, and support roles. The principal use during this period was undergraduate training of multiengine aircraft pilots slated for reciprocating engine or turboprop cargo, aerial refueling, or reconnaissance aircraft. Others were assigned to units of the Air National Guard in training roles in support of Northrop F-89 Scorpion and Lockheed F-94 Starfire operations. 

During its USAF tenure, many B-25s received the so-called "Hayes modification" and as a result, surviving B-25s often have exhaust systems with a semicollector ring that splits emissions into two different systems. The upper seven cylinders are collected by a ring, while the other cylinders remain directed to individual ports.

TB-25J-25-NC Mitchell, 44-30854, the last B-25 in the USAF inventory, assigned at March AFB, California, as of March 1960, was flown to Eglin AFB, Florida, from Turner Air Force Base, Georgia, on 21 May 1960, the last flight by a USAF B-25. It was presented by Brigadier General A. J. Russell, Commander of SAC's 822d Air Division at Turner AFB, to the Air Proving Ground Center Commander, Brigadier General Robert H. Warren. He in turn presented the bomber to Valparaiso, Florida, Mayor Randall Roberts on behalf of the Niceville-Valparaiso Chamber of Commerce. Four of the original Tokyo Raiders were present for the ceremony, Colonel (later Major General) David Jones, Colonel Jack Simms, Lieutenant Colonel Joseph Manske, and retired Master Sergeant Edwin W. Horton. It was donated back to the Air Force Armament Museum c. 1974 and marked as Doolittle's 40-2344.

U.S. Navy and USMC 

The U.S. Navy designation for the Mitchell was the PBJ-1 and apart from increased use of radar, it was configured like its Army Air Forces counterparts. Under the pre-1962 USN/USMC/USCG aircraft designation system, PBJ-1 stood for Patrol (P) Bomber (B) built by North American Aviation (J), first variant (-1) under the existing American naval aircraft designation system of the era. The PBJ had its origin in an inter-service agreement of mid-1942 between the Navy and the USAAF exchanging the Boeing Renton plant for the Kansas plant for B-29 Superfortress production. The Boeing XPBB Sea Ranger flying boat, competing for B-29 engines, was cancelled in exchange for part of the Kansas City Mitchell production. Other terms included the interservice transfer of 50 B-25Cs and 152 B-25Ds to the Navy. The bombers carried Navy bureau numbers (BuNos), beginning with BuNo 34998. The first PBJ-1 arrived in February 1943, and nearly all reached Marine Corps squadrons, beginning with Marine Bombing Squadron 413 (VMB-413). Following the AAFAC format, the Marine Mitchells had search radar in a retractable radome replacing the remotely operated ventral turret. Later D and J series had nose-mounted APS-3 radar; and later still, J and H series mounted radar in the starboard wingtip. The large quantities of B-25H and J series became known as PBJ-1H and PBJ-1J, respectively. These aircraft often operated along with earlier PBJ series in Marine squadrons.

The PBJs were operated almost exclusively by the Marine Corps as land-based bombers. The U.S. Marine Corps established Marine bomber squadrons (VMB), beginning with VMB-413, in March 1943 at MCAS Cherry Point, North Carolina. Eight VMB squadrons were flying PBJs by the end of 1943 as the initial Marine medium bombardment group. Four more squadrons were in the process of formation in late 1945, but had not yet deployed by the time the war ended.

Operations of the Marine Corps PBJ-1s began in March 1944. The Marine PBJs flew from the Philippines, Saipan, Iwo Jima, and Okinawa during the last few months of the Pacific war. Their primary mission was the long-range interdiction of enemy shipping trying to run the blockade, which was strangling Japan. The weapon of choice during these missions was usually the five-inch HVAR rocket, eight of which could be carried. Some VMB-612 intruder PBJ-1D and J series planes flew without top turrets to save weight and increase range on night patrols, especially towards the end of the war when air superiority had been achieved.  

During the war, the Navy tested the cannon-armed G series and conducted carrier trials with an H equipped with arresting gear. After World War II, some PBJs stationed at the Navy's rocket laboratory in Inyokern, California, site of the present-day Naval Air Weapons Station China Lake, tested air-to-ground rockets and arrangements. One arrangement was a twin-barrel nose that could fire 10 spin-stabilized five-inch rockets in one salvo.

Royal Air Force 
The Royal Air Force (RAF) was an early customer for the B-25 via Lend-Lease. The first Mitchells were given the service name Mitchell I by the RAF and were delivered in August 1941, to No. 111 Operational Training Unit based in the Bahamas. These bombers were used exclusively for training and familiarization and never became operational. The B-25Cs and Ds were designated Mitchell II. Altogether, 167 B-25Cs and 371 B-25Ds were delivered to the RAF. The RAF tested the cannon-armed G series but did not adopt the series nor the follow-on H series.

By the end of 1942, the RAF had taken delivery of 93 Mitchells, marks I and II. Some served with squadrons of No. 2 Group RAF, the RAF's tactical medium-bomber force, including No. 139 Wing RAF at RAF Dunsfold. The first RAF operation with the Mitchell II took place on 22 January 1943, when six aircraft from No. 180 Squadron RAF attacked oil installations at Ghent. After the invasion of Europe (by which point 2 Group was part of Second Tactical Air Force), all four Mitchell squadrons moved to bases in France and Belgium (Melsbroek) to support Allied ground forces. The British Mitchell squadrons were joined by No. 342 (Lorraine) Squadron of the French Air Force in April 1945.

As part of its move from Bomber Command, No 305 (Polish) Squadron flew Mitchell IIs from September to December 1943 before converting to the de Havilland Mosquito. In addition to No. 2 Group, the B-25 was used by various second-line RAF units in the UK and abroad. In the Far East, No. 3 PRU, which consisted of Nos. 681 and 684 Squadrons, flew the Mitchell (primarily Mk IIs) on photographic reconnaissance sorties.

Royal Canadian Air Force 
The Royal Canadian Air Force (RCAF) used the B-25 Mitchell for training during the war. Postwar use continued operations with most of the 162 Mitchells received. The first B-25s had been diverted to Canada from RAF orders. These included one Mitchell I, 42 Mitchell IIs, and 19 Mitchell IIIs. No 13 (P) Squadron was formed unofficially at RCAF Rockcliffe in May 1944 and used Mitchell IIs on high-altitude aerial photography sorties. No. 5 Operational Training Unit at Boundary Bay, British Columbia and Abbotsford, British Columbia, operated the B-25D Mitchell in the training role together with B-24 Liberators for Heavy Conversion as part of the BCATP. The RCAF retained the Mitchell until October 1963.

No 418 (Auxiliary) Squadron received its first Mitchell IIs in January 1947. It was followed by No 406 (auxiliary), which flew Mitchell IIs and IIIs from April 1947 to June 1958. No 418 operated a mix of IIs and IIIs until March 1958. No 12 Squadron of Air Transport Command also flew Mitchell IIIs along with other types from September 1956 to November 1960. In 1951, the RCAF received an additional 75 B-25Js from USAF stocks to make up for attrition and to equip various second-line units.

Royal Australian Air Force 
The Australians received Mitchells by the spring of 1944. The joint Australian-Dutch No. 18 (Netherlands East Indies) Squadron RAAF had more than enough Mitchells for one squadron, so the surplus went to re-equip the RAAF's No. 2 Squadron, replacing their Beauforts.

Dutch Air Force 

During World War II, the Mitchell served in fairly large numbers with the Air Force of the Dutch government-in-exile. They participated in combat in the East Indies, as well as on the European front. On 30 June 1941, the Netherlands Purchasing Commission, acting on behalf of the Dutch government-in-exile in London, signed a contract with North American Aviation for 162 B-25C aircraft. The bombers were to be delivered to the Netherlands East Indies to help deter any Japanese aggression into the region.

In February 1942, the British Overseas Airways Corporation agreed to ferry 20 Dutch B-25s from Florida to Australia travelling via Africa and India, and an additional 10 via the South Pacific route from California. During March, five of the bombers on the Dutch order had reached Bangalore, India, and 12 had reached Archerfield in Australia. The B-25s in Australia were used as the nucleus of a new squadron, No. 18. This squadron was staffed jointly by Australian and Dutch aircrews plus a smattering of aircrews from other nations, and operated under Royal Australian Air Force command for the remainder of the war.

The B-25s of No. 18 Squadron were painted with the Dutch national insignia (at that time a rectangular Netherlands flag) and carried NEIAF serials. Discounting the ten "temporary" B-25s delivered to 18 Squadron in early 1942, a total of 150 Mitchells were taken on strength by the NEIAF, 19 in 1942, 16 in 1943, 87 in 1944, and 28 in 1945. They flew bombing raids against Japanese targets in the East Indies. In 1944, the more capable B-25J Mitchells replaced most of the earlier C and D models.

In June 1940, No. 320 (Netherlands) Squadron RAF had been formed from personnel formerly serving with the Royal Dutch Naval Air Service, who had escaped to England after the German occupation of the Netherlands. Equipped with various British aircraft, No. 320 Squadron flew antisubmarine patrols, convoy escort missions, and performed air-sea rescue duties. They acquired the Mitchell II in September 1943, performing operations over Europe against gun emplacements, railway yards, bridges, troops, and other tactical targets. They moved to Belgium in October 1944, and transitioned to the Mitchell III in 1945. No. 320 Squadron was disbanded in August 1945. Following the war, B-25s were used by Dutch forces during the Indonesian National Revolution.

Soviet Air Force 
The USSR received 862 B-25s (B, C, D, G, and J types) from the United States under Lend-Lease during World War II via the Alaska–Siberia ALSIB ferry route. A total of 870 B-25s were sent to the Soviets, meaning that 8 aircraft were lost during transportation.

Other damaged B-25s arrived or crashed in the Far East of Russia, and one Doolittle Raid aircraft landed there short of fuel after attacking Japan. This lone airworthy Doolittle Raid aircraft to reach the Soviet Union was lost in a hangar fire in the early 1950s while undergoing routine maintenance. In general, the B-25 was operated as a ground-support and tactical daylight bomber (as similar Douglas A-20 Havocs were used). It saw action in fights from Stalingrad (with B/C/D models) to the German surrender during May 1945 (with G/J types).

The B-25s that remained in Soviet Air Force service after the war were assigned the NATO reporting name "Bank".

China 
Well over 100 B-25Cs and Ds were supplied to the Nationalist Chinese during the Second Sino-Japanese War. In addition, a total of 131 B-25Js were supplied to China under Lend-Lease.

The four squadrons of the 1st BG (1st, 2nd, 3rd, and 4th) of the 1st Medium Bomber Group were formed during the war. They formerly operated Russian-built Tupolev SB bombers, then transferred to the B-25. The 1st BG was under the command of Chinese-American Composite Wing while operating B-25s. Following the end of the war in the Pacific, these four bombardment squadrons were established to fight against the Communist insurgency that was rapidly spreading throughout the country. During the Chinese Civil War, Chinese Mitchells fought alongside de Havilland Mosquitos.

In December 1948, the Nationalists were forced to retreat to the island of Taiwan, taking many of their Mitchells with them. However, some B-25s were left behind and were pressed into service with the air force of the new People's Republic of China.

Brazilian Air Force 

During the war, the Força Aérea Brasileira received a few B-25s under Lend-Lease. Brazil declared war against the Axis powers in August 1942 and participated in the war against the U-boats in the southern Atlantic. The last Brazilian B-25 was finally declared surplus in 1970.

Free French 
The Royal Air Force issued at least 21 Mitchell IIIs to No 342 Squadron, which was made up primarily of Free French aircrews. Following the liberation of France, this squadron transferred to the newly formed French Air Force (Armée de l'Air) as GB I/20 Lorraine. The aircraft continued in operation after the war, with some being converted into fast VIP transports. They were struck off charge in June 1947.

Biafra 
In October 1967, during the Nigerian Civil War, Biafra bought two Mitchells. After a few bombings in November, they were put out of action in December.

Variants 

B-25
The initial production version of B-25s, they were powered by  R-2600-9 engines. and carried up to 3,600 lb (1,600 kg) of bombs and defensive armament of three .30 machine guns in nose, waist, and ventral positions, with one .50 machine gun in the tail. The first nine aircraft were built with constant dihedral angle. Due to low stability, the wing was redesigned so that the dihedral was eliminated on the outboard section (number made: 24).
B-25A
This version of the B-25 was modified to make it combat ready; additions included self-sealing fuel tanks, crew armor, and an improved tail-gunner station. No changes were made in the armament. It was redesignated obsolete (RB-25A) in 1942 (number made: 40).
B-25B
The tail and gun position were removed and replaced by a manned dorsal turret on the rear fuselage and retractable, remotely operated ventral turret, each with a pair of .50 in (12.7 mm) machine guns. A total of 120 were built (this version was used in the Doolittle Raid). A total of 23 were supplied to the Royal Air Force as the Mitchell Mk I.
B-25C
An improved version of the B-25B, its powerplants were upgraded from Wright R-2600-9 radials to R-2600-13s; de-icing and anti-icing equipment were added; the navigator received a sighting blister; and nose armament was increased to two .50 in (12.7 mm) machine guns, one fixed and one flexible. The B-25C model was the first mass-produced B-25 version; it was also used in the United Kingdom (as the Mitchell Mk II), in Canada, China, the Netherlands, and the Soviet Union (number made: 1,625).
ZB-25C
B-25D
Through block 20, the series was near identical to the B-25C. The series designation differed in that the B-25D was made in Kansas City, Kansas, whereas the B-25C was made in Inglewood, California. Later blocks with interim armament upgrades, the D2s, first flew on 3 January 1942 (number made: 2,290).

F-10
The F-10 designation distinguished 45 B-25Ds modified for photographic reconnaissance. All armament, armor, and bombing equipment were stripped. Three K.17 cameras were installed, one pointing down and two more mounted at oblique angles within blisters on each side of the nose. Optionally, a second downward-pointing camera could also be installed in the aft fuselage. Although designed for combat operations, these aircraft were mainly used for ground mapping.
B-25D weather reconnaissance variant
In 1944, four B-25Ds were converted for weather reconnaissance. One later user was the 53d Weather Reconnaissance Squadron, originally called the Army Hurricane Reconnaissance Unit, now called the "Hurricane Hunters". Weather reconnaissance first started in 1943 with the 1st Weather Reconnaissance Squadron, with flights on the North Atlantic ferry routes.

ZB-25D
XB-25E
A single B-25C was modified to test de-icing and anti-icing equipment that circulated exhaust from the engines in chambers in the leading and trailing edges and empennage. The aircraft was tested for almost two years, beginning in 1942; while the system proved extremely effective, no production models were built that used it before the end of World War II. Many surviving warbird-flown B-25 aircraft today use the de-icing system from the XB-25E (number made: 1, converted).
ZXB-25E
XB-25F-A
A modified B-25C, it used insulated electrical coils mounted inside the wing and empennage leading edges to test the effectiveness as a de-icing system. The hot air de-icing system tested on the XB-25E was determined to be the more practical of the two (number made: 1, converted).
XB-25G
This modified B-25C had the transparent nose replaced to create a short-nosed gunship carrying two fixed .50 in (12.7 mm) machine guns and a 75 mm (2.95 in) M4 cannon, then the largest weapon ever carried on an American bomber (number made: 1, converted).
B-25G
The B-25G followed the success of the prototype XB-25G and production was a continuation of the NA96. The production model featured increased armor and a greater fuel supply than the XB-25G. One B-25G was passed to the British, who gave it the name Mitchell II that had been used for the B-25C. The USSR also tested the G (number made: 463; five converted Cs, 58 modified Cs, 400 production).

B-25H
An improved version of the B-25G, this version relocated the manned dorsal turret to a more forward location on the fuselage just aft of the flight deck. It also featured two additional fixed .50 in (12.7 mm) machine guns in the nose and in the H-5 onward, four in fuselage-mounted pods. The T13E1 light weight cannon replaced the heavy M4 cannon 75 mm (2.95 in). Single controls were installed from the factory with navigator in the right seat (number made: 1000; two airworthy ).
B-25J-NC
 Follow-on production at Kansas City, the B-25J could be called a cross between the B-25D and the B-25H. It had a transparent nose, but many of the delivered aircraft were modified to have a strafer nose (J2). Most of its 14–18 machine guns were forward-facing for strafing missions, including the two guns of the forward-located dorsal turret. The RAF received 316 aircraft, which were known as the Mitchell III. The J series was the last factory series production of the B-25 (number made: 4,318).
CB-25J
Utility transport version
VB-25J
A number of B-25s were converted for use as staff and VIP transports. Henry H. Arnold and Dwight D. Eisenhower both used converted B-25Js as their personal transports. The last VB-25J in active service was retired in May 1960 at the Eglin Air Force Base in Florida.

Trainer variants 
Most models of the B-25 were used at some point as training aircraft.
TB-25D
Originally designated AT-24A (Advanced Trainer, Model 24, Version A), trainer modification of B-25D often with the dorsal turret omitted, in total, 60 AT-24s were built.
TB-25G
Originally designated AT-24B, trainer modification of B-25G
TB-25C
Originally designated AT-24C, trainer modification of B-25C
TB-25J
Originally designated AT-24D, trainer modification of B-25J, another 600 B-25Js were modified after the war.
TB-25K
Hughes E1 fire-control radar trainer (Hughes) (number made: 117)
TB-25L
Hayes pilot-trainer conversion (number made: 90)
TB-25M
Hughes E5 fire-control radar trainer (number made: 40)
TB-25N
Hayes navigator-trainer conversion (number made: 47)

U.S. Navy / U.S. Marine Corps variants 

PBJ-1C
Similar to the B-25C for the U.S. Navy, it was often fitted with airborne search radar and used in the antisubmarine role.
PBJ-1D
Similar to the B-25D for the U.S. Navy and U.S. Marine Corps, it differed in having a single .50 in (12.7 mm) machine gun in the tail turret and waist gun positions similar to the B-25H. Often it was fitted with airborne search radar and used in the antisubmarine role.
PBJ-1G
U.S. Navy/U.S. Marine Corps designation for the B-25G, trials only
PBJ-1H
U.S. Navy/U.S. Marine Corps designation for the B-25H
One PBJ-1H was modified with carrier takeoff and landing equipment and successfully tested on the USS Shangri-La, but the Navy did not continue development.
PBJ-1J
U.S. Navy designation for the B-25J (Blocks −1 through −35), it had improvements in radio and other equipment. Beside the standard armament package, the Marines often fitted it with 5-inch underwing rockets and search radar for the antishipping/antisubmarine role. The large Tiny Tim rocket-powered warhead was used in 1945.

Operators 

 An ex-USAAF TB-25N (s/n 44-31173) acquired in June 1961 and registered locally as LV-GXH, it was privately operated as a smuggling aircraft. It was confiscated by provincial authorities in 1971 and handed over to Empresa Provincial de Aviacion Civil de San Juan, which operated it until its retirement due to a double engine failure in 1976. Currently, it is under restoration to airworthiness.

 Royal Australian Air Force – 50 aircraft, including three joint units with Military Aviation – Royal Dutch East Indies Army (ML-KNIL):
 No. 2 Squadron RAAF;
 No. 18 (Netherlands East Indies) Squadron RAAF;
 No. 19 (Netherlands East Indies) Squadron RAAF and;
 No. 119 (Netherlands East Indies) Squadron RAAF.

 Biafran Air Force operated two aircraft.

 Bolivian Air Force operated 13 aircraft

 Brazilian Air Force operated 75 aircraft, including B-25B, B-25C, and B-25J.

 Royal Canadian Air Force operated 164 aircraft in bomber, light transport, trainer, and "special" mission roles.
 No. 13 (P) Squadron Mitchell II at RCAF Station Rockcliffe 
 No. 406 Auxiliary Squadron Mitchell III

 Republic of China Air Force operated more than 180 aircraft.

 People's Liberation Army Air Force operated captured Nationalist Chinese aircraft.

 Chilean Air Force operated 12 aircraft.

 Colombian Air Force operated three aircraft.

 Cuban Army Air Force operated six aircraft.
 Fuerza Aérea del Ejército de Cuba
 Cuerpo de Aviación del Ejército de Cuba

 Dominican Air Force operated five aircraft.

 French Air Force operated 11 aircraft.
 Free French Air Force operated 18 aircraft.

 Indonesian Air Force – in 1950, received some B-25 Mitchells previously operated by the Military Aviation – Royal Dutch East Indies Army (ML-KNIL. The last of these served the Indonesian military until 1979.

 Mexican Air Force received three B-25Js in December 1945, which remained in use until at least 1950.
 Eight Mexican civil registrations were allocated to B-25s, including one aircraft registered to the Bank of Mexico, but used by the President of Mexico.

 Military Aviation – Royal Dutch East Indies Army (ML-KNIL; 1942–1950): 149 aircraft  (initially in three joint units with the Royal Australian Air Force) during World War II and the Indonesian War of Independence:
 No. 18 Squadron (NEI) RAAF/18 Squadron ML-KNIL (1942–1950) – bomber
 No. 119 (Netherlands East Indies) Squadron RAAF (1943–1943) – bomber
 No. 19 Squadron (NEI) RAAF/19 Squadron ML-KNIL (1944–1948) – transport
 16 Squadron ML-KNIL (1946–1948) – ground attack  
 20 Squadron ML-KNIL (1946–1950) – transport

 Naval Aviation Service (MLD) – 107 aircraft; initially in a joint unit with the UK Royal Air Force:
 No. 320 (Netherlands) Squadron RAF (1942–1946)

 Peruvian Air Force received eight B-25Js in 1947, which formed Bomber Squadron N° 21 at Talara.

 Polish Air Forces on exile in Great Britain
 No. 305 Polish Bomber Squadron

 Spanish Air Force operated one ex-USAAF example interned in 1944 and operated between 1948 and 1956.

 Soviet Air Force (Voyenno-Vozdushnye Sily or VVS) received a total of 866 B-25s of the C, D, G*, and J series.  * trials only (5).

 Royal Air Force received just over 700 aircraft.
 No. 98 Squadron RAF – September 1942 – November 1945 (converted to the Mosquito
 No. 180 Squadron RAF – September 1942 – September 1945 (converted to the Mosquito)
 No. 226 Squadron RAF – May 1943 – September 1945 (disbanded)
 No. 305 Polish Bomber Squadron – September 1943 – December 1943 (converted to the Mosquito)
 No. 320 (Netherlands) Squadron RAF – March 1943 – August 1945 (transferred to Netherlands)
 No. 342 (GB I/20 'Lorraine') Squadron RAF – March 1945 – December 1945 (transferred to France)
 No. 681 Squadron RAF – January 1943 – December 1943 (Mitchell withdrawn)
 No. 684 Squadron RAF – September 1943 – April 1944 (Replaced by Mosquito)
 No. 111 Operational Training Unit RAF, Nassau Airport, Bahamas, August 1942 – August 1945 (disbanded)
 Royal Navy Fleet Air Arm
 operated 1 aircraft for evaluation 

 United States Army Air Forces
 see B-25 Mitchell units of the United States Army Air Forces
 United States Navy received 706 aircraft, most of which were then transferred to the USMC.
 United States Marine Corps

 Uruguayan Air Force operated 15 aircraft.

 Venezuelan Air Force operated 24 aircraft.

Accidents and incidents 
Empire State Building crash

At 9:40 on Saturday, 28 July 1945, a USAAF B-25D crashed in thick fog into the north side of the Empire State Building between the 79th and 80th floors. Fourteen people died — 11 in the building and the three occupants of the aircraft, including the pilot, Colonel William F. Smith. Betty Lou Oliver, an elevator attendant, survived the impact and the subsequent fall of the elevator cage 75 stories to the basement.

French general Philippe Leclerc was aboard his North American B-25 Mitchell, Tailly II, when it crashed near Colomb-Béchar in French Algeria on 28 November 1947, killing everyone on board.

Surviving aircraft 
 

Many B-25s are currently kept in airworthy condition by air museums and collectors.

Specifications (B-25H)

Notable appearances in media

See also

Notes

References

Bibliography 
 Borth, Christy. Masters of Mass Production. Indianapolis, Indiana: Bobbs-Merrill Co., 1945.
 Bridgman, Leonard, ed. "The North American Mitchell." Jane's Fighting Aircraft of World War II. London: Studio, 1946. .
 Caidin, Martin. Air Force. New York: Arno Press, 1957.
 Chorlton, Martyn. "Database: North American B-25 Mitchell". Aeroplane, Vol. 41, No. 5, May 2013. pp. 69–86.
 Dorr, Robert F. "North American B-25 Variant Briefing". Wings of Fame, Volume 3, 1996. London: Aerospace Publishing. . . pp. 118–141.
 Green, William. Famous Bombers of the Second World War. New York: Doubleday & Company, 1975. .
 Hagedorn, Dan. "Latin Mitchells: North American B-25s in South America, Part One". Air Enthusiast No. 105, May/June 2003. pp. 52–55. 
 Hagedorn, Dan. "Latin Mitchells: North American B-25s in South America, Part Three". Air Enthusiast Mo. 107, September/October 2003. pp. 36–41. 
 Hardesty, Von. Red Phoenix: The Rise of Soviet Air Power 1941–1945. Washington, D.C.: Smithsonian Institution, 1991, first edition 1982. .
 Heller, Joseph. Catch 22. New York: Simon & Schuster, 1961. .
 Herman, Arthur. Freedom's Forge: How American Business Produced Victory in World War II, New York: Random House, 2012. .
 Higham, Roy and Carol Williams, eds. Flying Combat Aircraft of USAAF-USAF (Vol. 1). Andrews AFB, Maryland: Air Force Historical Foundation, 1975. .
 Higham, Roy and Carol Williams, eds. Flying Combat Aircraft of USAAF-USAF (Vol. 2). Andrews AFB, Maryland: Air Force Historical Foundation, 1978. .
 Johnsen, Frederick A. North American B-25 Mitchell. Stillwater, Minnesota: Voyageur Press, 1997. .
 Kingwell, Mark. Nearest Thing to Heaven: The Empire State Building and American Dreams. New Haven, Connecticut: Yale University Press, 2007. .
 Kinzey, Bert. B-25 Mitchell in Detail. Carrollton, Texas: Squadron/Signal Publications Inc., 1999. .
 Kit, Mister and Jean-Pierre De Cock. North American B-25 Mitchell (in French). Paris, France: Éditions Atlas, 1980.
 McDowell, Ernest R. B-25 Mitchell in Action (Aircraft number 34). Carrollton, Texas: Squadron/Signal Publications Inc., 1978. .
 McDowell, Ernest R. North American B-25A/J Mitchell (Aircam No.22). Canterbury, Kent, UK: Osprey Publications Ltd., 1971. .
 Mizrahi, J.V. North American B-25: The Full Story of World War II's Classic Medium. Hollywood, California: Challenge Publications Inc., 1965.
 Norton, Bill. American Bomber Aircraft Development in World War 2. Hersham, Surrey, UK: Midland Publishing, 2012. .
 Pace, Steve. B-25 Mitchell Units in the MTO. Oxford, UK: Osprey Publishing, 2002. .
 Pace, Steve. Warbird History: B-25 Mitchell. St. Paul, Minnesota: Motorbooks International, 1994. .
 Parker, Dana T. Building Victory: Aircraft Manufacturing in the Los Angeles Area in World War II. Cypress, California: Dana Parker Enterprises, 2013. .

 Powell, Albrecht. "Mystery in the Mon".  1994

 Scutts, Jerry. B-25 Mitchell at War. London: Ian Allan, 1983. .
 Scutts, Jerry. North American B-25 Mitchell. Ramsbury, Marlborough, Wiltshire, UK: Crowood Press, 2001. .
 Skaarup, Harold A. Canadian Warplanes. Bloomington, Indiana: IUniverse, 2009. .
 Swanborough, F.G. and Peter M. Bowers. United States Military Aircraft since 1909. London: Putnam, 1963.
 Swanborough, Gordon. North American, An Aircraft Album No. 6. New York: Arco Publishing Company Inc., 1973. .
 Tallman, Frank. Flying the Old Planes. New York: Doubleday and Company, 1973. .
 
 Wolf, William. North American B-25 Mitchell, The Ultimate Look: from Drawing Board to Flying Arsenal. Atglen, Pennsylvania: Schiffer Publishing, 2008. .
 Yenne, Bill. Rockwell: The Heritage of North American. New York: Crescent Books, 1989. .

External links 

 North American B-25 Mitchell Joe Baugher, American Military Aircraft: US Bomber Aircraft
 
 I Fly Mitchell's, February 1944 Popular Science article on B-25s in North Africa Theater
 Flying Big Gun, February 1944, Popular Science article on 75 mm cannon mount
 Early B-25 model's tail gun position, extremely rare photo
 A collection photos of the Marine VMB-613 post in the Kwajalein Island at the University of Houston Digital Library 
 Hi-res spherical panoramas; B-25H: A look inside & out – "Barbie III"
 (1943) Report No. NA-5785 Temporary Handbook of Erection and Maintenance Instructions for the B-25 H-1-NA Medium Bombardment Airplanes
 "The B-25 Mitchell in the USSR", an account of the service history of the Mitchell in the Soviet Union's VVS during World War II
 Lake Murray's Mitchell
 B-25 Recovery and Preservation Project Rubicon Foundation

Aircraft first flown in 1940
Gull-wing aircraft
Mid-wing aircraft
B-25
1940s United States bomber aircraft
World War II bombers of the United States
Twin piston-engined tractor aircraft